Valley Truckle is a hamlet on the A39 road south of Camelford in Cornwall, England. Its name probably derives from a corruption of Cornish "Vellan draeth" (i.e. fulling mill). This was suggested by Charles Henderson.

References

Hamlets in Cornwall
Camelford